Billy Dee Smith (born June 30, 1982 in St. Catharines, Ontario) is a former professional lacrosse player played for the Buffalo Bandits and Rochester Knighthawks of the National Lacrosse League and the Hamilton Nationals of Major League Lacrosse. He was also a member of the gold medal winning Canadian lacrosse team at the 2006 World Lacrosse Championship. Smith is an assistant coach for the Halifax Thunderbirds.

Smith was named Defensive Player of the Year for the 2009 NLL season.  Injuries have limited his career.

In 2019, Smith was announced as part of Paul Rabil’s new Premier Lacrosse League as a member of Chaos Lacrosse Club.

Statistics

NLL

Awards

References

1982 births
Living people
Buffalo Bandits players
Canadian lacrosse players
Halifax Thunderbirds coaches
Hamilton Nationals players
Lacrosse people from Ontario
National Lacrosse League major award winners
Sportspeople from St. Catharines